Dawn of Retribution is an Australian heavy metal band from Geelong. The band was formed in 2007. Since the band's inception, they have released one demo CD, Blood Drunk and one full studio album The Plan to End Humanity.

Discography 
 Blood Drunk [Demo] (2007)

The Plan to End Humanity (2010) is Dawn of Retribution's first full-length studio album.

References 

Australian heavy metal musical groups
Musical groups established in 2007
Musical groups from Geelong